Rutterkin may refer to:

Rutterkin, the supposed familiar of Joan Flower, one of the Witches of Belvoir
Rutterkin (Dungeons & Dragons), a demon in the Dungeons & Dragons role-playing game
"Rutterkin", an episode of Robin of Sherwood
Rutterkin, punk rock band from St. Petersburg, Florida